Zhang Yunxia (July 1926 – 18 April 2004), born Tao Dimin, was a Chinese Yue opera singer-actress who played Dan (female) roles. She studied under Yuan Xuefen but developed her own style, and is now recognized as the founder of the "Zhang school".

He Saifei, one of her students, rose to fame in the 1980s.

References

1926 births
2004 deaths
Yue opera actresses
20th-century Chinese actresses
Singers from Shanghai
Actresses from Shanghai
20th-century Chinese women singers